Botanical Gardens is a cricket ground and public reserve in Nelson, Nelson Region, New Zealand.

It is located in Nelson's town belt, next to Botanical Reserve. The trigonometrical 'Centre of New Zealand', Botanical Hill, is located beside the park.

The first recorded cricket match held on the ground came in January 1873 when Nelson played Auckland.  The ground later held a first-class match when Nelson played Wellington on 31 December 1883, which Nelson won by 39 runs.  

Besides cricket, the ground also saw one of the first rugby matches to be played in New Zealand, between Nelson College and a group of local players on 14 May 1870. After Trafalgar Park's development as Nelson's main sports venue in the 1880s the Botanical Gardens was no longer used for major sports events. The ground, however, has continued to exist, and is used today by Athletic College Old Boys Cricket Club.

References

External links
Botanical Gardens at ESPNcricinfo
Botanical Gardens at CricketArchive

1870s establishments in New Zealand
Cricket grounds in New Zealand
Rugby union stadiums in New Zealand
Sports venues in the Nelson Region
Protected areas of the Nelson Region
Nelson, New Zealand